Evart is a city in Osceola County in the U.S. state of Michigan. The population was 1,903 at the 2010 census. The city lies on the northern edge of Evart Township and is partially within neighboring Osceola Township, although the city is administered autonomously.

History
Evart was founded in 1871 by D. A. Blodgett and James Kennedy. The first settler in Evart was Joseph Smith, and the town was named after Perry Oliver "Frank" Everts, an early pioneer of Osceola Township.  The village was platted in 1872, incorporated in 1873, and re-incorporated in 1875.  Its population in 1884 was estimated to be 1,500.

Geography

Climate
This climatic region has large seasonal temperature differences, with warm to hot (and often humid) summers and cold (sometimes severely cold) winters.  According to the Köppen Climate Classification system, Evart has a humid continental climate, abbreviated "Dfb" on climate maps.

Demographics

2010 census
As of the census of 2010, there were 1,903 people, 767 households, and 466 families residing in the city. The racial makeup of the city was 95.7% White, 0.8% African American, 0.8% Native American, 0.1% Asian, 0.1% Pacific Islander, 0.1% from other races, and 2.5% from two or more races. Hispanic or Latino of any race were 2.2% of the population.

There were 767 households, of which 35.9% had children under the age of 18 living with them, 36.8% were married couples living together, 18.4% had a female householder with no husband present, 5.6% had a male householder with no wife present, and 39.2% were non-families. 34.4% of all households were made up of individuals, and 16% had someone living alone who was 65 years of age or older. The average household size was 2.45 and the average family size was 3.11.

The median age in the city was 33.5 years. 28.5% of residents were under the age of 18; 11% were between the ages of 18 and 24; 22.6% were from 25 to 44; 22.1% were from 45 to 64; and 15.9% were 65 years of age or older. The gender makeup of the city was 45.3% male and 54.7% female.

2000 census
As of the census of 2000, there were 1,738 people, 699 households, and 452 families residing in the city. The racial makeup of the city was 96.61% White, 0.52% African American, 0.98% Native American, 0.12% Asian, 0.12% Pacific Islander, 0.29% from other races, and 1.38% from two or more races. Hispanic or Latino of any race were 1.27% of the population.

There were 699 households, out of which 34.0% had children under the age of 18 living with them, 42.5% were married couples living together, 17.7% had a female householder with no husband present, and 35.2% were non-families. 31.0% of all households were made up of individuals, and 14.9% had someone living alone who was 65 years of age or older.  The average household size was 2.45 and the average family size was 3.05.

In the city, the population was spread out, with 29.2% under the age of 18, 10.5% from 18 to 24, 24.0% from 25 to 44, 21.4% from 45 to 64, and 14.9% who were 65 years of age or older.  The median age was 34 years. For every 100 females, there were 81.8 males.  For every 100 females age 18 and over, there were 81.1 males.

The median income for a household in the city was $23,348, and the median income for a family was $28,100. Males had a median income of $26,105 versus $20,063 for females. The per capita income for the city was $12,691.  About 18.8% of families and 24.8% of the population were below the poverty line, including 32.0% of those under age 18 and 15.5% of those age 65 or over.

Education
There is one school district in Evart which operates a single elementary school, a single middle school and a single high school.

Government 
The Evart City Council consists of a Mayor, Mayor Pro-Tem, and 4 council members.

The City of Evart also provides a police department and other municipal services such as the Dept. of Public Works & Streets, Water and Sewer, City Hall, Parks & Recreation Dept., the Local Development Financial Authority and the Downtown Development Authority.

Notable people
 Wish Egan, Major League Baseball player and scout, was born in Evart.
 Joseph William Guyton, the first American soldier to be killed on German soil during World War I, was born in Evart.
 Jerry and Marge Selbee, the elderly couple who were the basis of the movie Jerry & Marge Go Large live in Evart.

References

External links
City of Evart website

Cities in Osceola County, Michigan
1871 establishments in Michigan
Populated places established in 1871